Edmund Jackson Davis (October 2, 1827 – February 24, 1883) was an American lawyer, soldier, and politician. Davis was a Southern Unionist and a general in the Union Army in the American Civil War. He also served as the 14th Governor of Texas from 1870 to 1874, during the Reconstruction era. Reviled by many Texans during and after the Civil War as a traitor for his open support for the North and his attempts to break up Texas into several Northern-controlled states, Davis is known for leasing prisoners to private corporations to alleviate state budget shortfalls.

Early years
Davis was born in St. Augustine, Florida, a son of William Godwin Davis and the former Mary Ann Channer. His father was a lawyer and land developer in St. Augustine, the oldest permanent settlement in the United States. In 1848, after the signing of the Treaty of Guadalupe Hidalgo, Davis moved with his parents to Galveston, Texas.

The next year, Davis moved to Corpus Christi, where he was admitted to the bar. He was an inspector and deputy collector of customs from 1849 to 1853, when he was appointed district attorney of the 12th Judicial District, which included Webb County in south Texas. He became a judge in that district.

The 1850 census has Davis living on Grant Street in downtown Laredo, the seat of Webb County. Davis, three carpenters, and a laborer were residing, apparently in a boarding house, with Tomasa Benavides and her children when the census was taken that year. He subsequently maintained a ranch in Webb County and conducted his law practice in Laredo. For a time he was a judge of the state's 29th Judicial District.

Civil War years
In early 1861, Edmund Davis supported Governor Sam Houston in his stand against secession. Davis also urged Robert E. Lee not to violate his oath of allegiance to the United States. Davis ran to become a delegate to the Secession Convention but was defeated. He thereafter refused to take an oath of allegiance to the Confederate States of America and was removed from his judgeship. He travelled from Texas and took refuge in Union-held New Orleans, Louisiana. He next sailed to Washington, D.C., where President Abraham Lincoln issued him a colonel's commission with the authority to recruit the 1st Texas Cavalry Regiment (Union).

Davis recruited his regiment from Union men who had fled from Texas to Louisiana. The regiment would see considerable action during the remainder of the war. On November 10, 1864, President Lincoln appointed Davis as a brigadier general of volunteers. Lincoln did not submit Davis's nomination to this grade to the U.S. Senate until December 12, 1864. The U.S. Senate confirmed the appointment on February 14, 1865. Davis was among those present when General Edmund Kirby Smith surrendered the Confederate forces in Texas on June 2, 1865. Davis was mustered out of the volunteers on August 24, 1865.

In March 1863, Davis and his friend William W. Montgomery had heard that they were going to be arrested by Confederate Soldiers in Austin, Texas.  Both Davis and Montgomery quickly gathered up a few of their things and headed to Hamilton Pool, just outside of Austin, where they hid out before deciding to meet up with other Union soldiers in Matamoros, Mexico.  At the border, there were numerous reports that Confederate soldiers and Union soldiers would taunt each other across the border at night, sometimes getting into fights.  After setting up camp in Matamoros, Montgomery discovered that Confederate forces planned to come across the border to arrest Davis.  Montgomery raced back to the camp to try and warn Davis, only to find that Confederate soldiers were already there.  The Confederates hanged Montgomery on the way back into Texas.  Shortly after the war Davis petitioned Congress to instate a pension for Montgomery's widow.

Post war
Following the end of the war, Davis became a member of the 1866 Texas Constitutional Convention. He supported the rights of freed slaves and urged the division of Texas into several Republican-controlled states.

In 1869, he was narrowly elected governor against Andrew Jackson Hamilton, a Unionist Democrat. As a Radical Republican during Reconstruction, his term in office was controversial.

On July 22, 1870, the Texas State Police came into being by Radical Republican legislation. The State Police were to have extraordinary powers, including taking offenders from one county to another for trial and of operating undercover as secret agents.  It worked against racially based crimes, and included black police officers, which caused protest from former slaveowners (and future segregationists). Davis created the "State Guard of Texas" and the "Reserve Militia", which were forerunners of the Texas National Guard. The Printing Bill provided an official public printer and a state journal and provided that regional newspapers be designated to print the various required official notices.

Davis' government was marked by a commitment to the civil rights of African Americans. One of his protégés was Norris Wright Cuney of Galveston, who continued the struggle for equality until his own death in 1896 and is honored as one of the important figures in Texas and American black history. Though Davis was highly unpopular among former Confederates, and most material written about him for many years was unfavorable, he was considered to have been a hero for the Union Army. He also gained the respect and friendship of Spanish-speaking residents on the Rio Grande frontier.

In 1873, Davis was defeated for reelection by Democrat Richard Coke (42,633 votes to 85,549 votes) in an election marked by irregularities. Davis contested the results and refused to leave his office on the ground floor of the Capitol. Democratic lawmakers and Governor-elect Coke reportedly had to climb ladders to the Capitol's second story, where the legislature convened. When President Grant refused to send troops to the defeated governor's rescue, Davis reluctantly left the capital in January 1874. He locked the door to the governor's office and took the key, forcing Coke's supporters to break in with an axe.  John Henninger Reagan helped to oust him after he tried to stay in office beyond the end of his term. Davis was the last Republican governor of Texas until Republican Bill Clements defeated the Democrat John Luke Hill in 1978 and assumed the governorship the following January, 105 years after Davis vacated the office.

Following his defeat, Davis was nominated to be collector of customs at Galveston but declined the appointment because he disliked U.S. President Rutherford B. Hayes. He ran for governor again in 1880 but was soundly defeated. His name was placed in nomination for Vice President of the United States at the 1880 Republican National Convention, which met in Chicago and chose James A. Garfield as the standard-bearer. Had Davis succeeded, he might have wound up in the White House, as did Chester A. Arthur, the man who received the vice presidential nomination that year. Davis lost an election for the United States House of Representatives in 1882.

After Democrats regained power in the state legislature, they passed laws making voter registration more difficult, such as requiring payment of poll taxes, which worked to disfranchise blacks, Mexican Americans and poor whites. They also instituted a white primary. In the 1890s more than 100,000 blacks were voting, but by 1906 only 5,000 managed to get through these barriers.  As Texas became essentially a one-party state, the white primary excluded minorities from the political competitive process. They did not fully recover their constitutional rights until after enforcement under the Voting Rights Act of 1965.

Edmund J. Davis died in 1883 and was given a war hero's burial at the Texas State Cemetery in Austin. A large gravestone was placed in Davis's honor by a brother. Davis was survived by his wife, the former Anne Elizabeth Britton (whose father, Forbes Britton, had been chief of staff to Texas Governor Sam Houston), and two sons: Britton (a West Point graduate and military officer) and Waters (an attorney and merchant in El Paso).

See also
List of American Civil War generals (Union)
Battle of La Ebonal

References

Further reading
 Carl H. Moneyon. Edmund J. Davis: Civil War General, Republican Leader, Reconstruction Governor (Texas Christian University Press, 2010) 352 pages. Biography.
William W Montgomery
SOURCES

“An Act granting a Pension to Mary Ann Montgomery, Widow of Wm. W. Montgomery, late Captain in Texas Volunteers,” 17 Stat. 677 (7 June 1872); digital images, “A Century of Lawmaking for a New Nation: U.S. Congressional Documents and Debates, 1774-1875,” Library of Congress, American Memory (http://memory.loc.gov/ammem/index.html : accessed 28 Sep 2014). ↩
“Joint Resolution of the Legislature of Texas…,” House Misc. Doc. No. 43, 42nd Congress, 2d Session, The Miscellaneous Documents Printed by Order of the House of Representatives, … 1871-’72, 4 vols. (Washington, D.C.: Government Printing Office, 1872), 2: 43; digital images, Google Books (http://books.google.com : accessed 28 Sep 2014). Note: John Wesley’s birth year was originally posted as “185i” and has been corrected, thanks to a reader’s eagle eye. ↩
Affidavit of Richard Pendergrast, 11 Dec 1863, in The Miscellaneous Documents Printed by Order of the House of Representatives, … 1889-90, (Washington, D.C.: Government Printing Office, 1891), U.S. Congressional Serial Set 2769: 867-858; digital images, Google Books (http://books.google.com : accessed 28 Sep 2014). ↩
Dean W. Holt, American Military Cemeteries, 2d ed. (Jefferson, N.C. : McFarland & Co., 2010). ↩
Stanley S. McGowen, Horse Sweat and Powder Smoke: The First Texas Cavalry in the Civil War (College Station, Tex. : Texas A&M Univ. Press, 1999). ↩

External links
 Eicher, John H., and David J. Eicher, Civil War High Commands. Stanford: Stanford University Press, 2001. .

1827 births
1883 deaths
Union Army generals
Republican Party governors of Texas
People of Texas in the American Civil War
Texas state court judges
Burials at Texas State Cemetery
People from St. Augustine, Florida
People from Galveston, Texas
People from Corpus Christi, Texas
People from Laredo, Texas
People from Austin, Texas
Activists for African-American civil rights
Southern Unionists in the American Civil War
Activists from Texas
19th-century American judges
Military personnel from Texas